Victor Sheronas (January 1, 1909 – June 8, 1981) was an American sailor. He competed in the 5.5 Metre event at the 1956 Summer Olympics.

References

External links
 

1909 births
1981 deaths
American male sailors (sport)
Olympic sailors of the United States
Sailors at the 1956 Summer Olympics – 5.5 Metre
Sportspeople from Waterbury, Connecticut